Regulator of chromosome condensation 1, also known as RCC1, Ran guanine nucleotide exchange factor and RanGEF, is the name for a human gene and protein.

RCC1 also functions as a guanine nucleotide exchange factor for Ran GTPase.

Interactions 

RCC1 has been shown to interact with RANBP3 and Ran (biology).

References

Further reading